Lieutenant General Phone Myat (born  1964) is a Burmese military officer and current commander of the Bureau of Special Operations (BSO) No. 3, which encompasses military forces in Ayeyarwady, Bago and Magway Regions, and Rakhine and Chin States. He has been sanctioned by the European Union, Switzerland, and Canada for violating human rights and committing crimes against civilians in the aftermath of the 2021 Myanmar coup d'état.

Military career 
Thet Pon graduated from the Officers Training School, Bahtoo. He served as the commander of the Northeastern Command from 2017 to 2018, the Western Command from May 2019 to July 2020, and was appointed as a deputy minister for border affairs from 2020 to 2021. He was appointed as commander of BSO No. 3 in April 2021. As of October 2022, he administered the Office of the Commander-in-Chief.

See also 

 2021–2023 Myanmar civil war
 State Administration Council
 Tatmadaw

References 

Living people
Burmese generals
Officers Training School, Bahtoo alumni
Year of birth missing (living people)